Ryan Colahan (born 22 February 1989) is a former Zimbabwean rower. Along with his brother Liam, he won a bronze medal in the men's lightweight double sculls at the 2007 All-Africa Games. He also competed at the 2006 and 2007 World Rowing Junior Championships.

References 

Zimbabwean male rowers
1989 births
Sportspeople from Harare
Living people
African Games bronze medalists for Zimbabwe
African Games medalists in rowing
Competitors at the 2007 All-Africa Games